The 1997–98 National League 1, sponsored by Jewson, was the eleventh full season of rugby union within the third tier of the English league system, currently known as National League 1.

Structure
The league consisted of fourteen teams, playing each other on a home and away basis to make a total of twenty-six matches for each team. There were four promotion places with the top four teams promoted to the 1998–99 Allied Dunbar Premiership Two. There was no relegation, this season, to either National Division 4 North or South due to an increase, from twelve teams to fourteen, in the top two divisions.

Participating teams and locations 

National Division Three was reduced from sixteen teams to fourteen with ten of the clubs participating in last seasons competition. To make up the numbers two of the teams (Rugby Lions and Nottingham) were relegated from National League 2, and the champions of National 4 North (Worcester) and National 4 South (Newbury) were both promoted.

League table

Sponsorship
For the first ten seasons Courage Brewery sponsored the league. Following reorganisation the top two divisions are sponsored by the assurance company Allied Dunbar and the rest of the divisions, including National League 1 is sponsored by the building suppliers, Jewson.

See also
 English Rugby Union Leagues
 English rugby union system
 Rugby union in England

References

Nat
National League 1 seasons